Clara Power Edgerly (?–1897) was a prominent elocutionist and principal of the Boston College of Oratory and Delsarte Ideal Training School, informally known as the Boston College of Oratory.

Career
Edgerly, a former teacher of pantomime at the rival Boston School of Oratory, founded the Boston College of Oratory and Delsarte Ideal Training School in 1892. Boston was a center of elocutionary training at the time, and Edgerly was the only woman to head any of the city's oratory schools. Its facilities were on Boylston St.

Edgerly was especially interested in the Delsarte method of dramatic expression and in "statue posing" for tableaux vivants, and the school's curriculum included training in these as well as physical and vocal training. Her advanced students formed the Edgerly Tableaux Troupe and gave public exhibitions. Courses of study were two to three years in length.

Edgerly was also interested in dress reform.

The Boston College of Oratory was incorporated into the rival School of Expression in 1895, and Edgerly died unexpectedly in 1897.

References

1897 deaths
American school administrators
Year of birth missing
People from Boston